Chagallu is a village in East Godavari district of the Indian state of Andhra Pradesh. It is located in Chagallu mandal in Kovvur revenue division.

Economy
This town has two big industries, but present they are closed (due to some economical problem to management)
one is VVS Sugars Ltd (The Jeypore Sugars Ltd), and another one is the Distillery Division of the Jeypore Sugars Ltd.

Agriculture is the second bone for ECONOMY in that region, most farmers prefer to grow sugarcane and Paddy's (rice) after shutting down sugarcane factory, people are preferring other crops but paddy is the ever green crop in that region.

Demographics 

 Census of India, Chagallu had a population of 21703. The total population constitute, 10843 males and 10860 females with a sex ratio of 1002 females per 1000 males. 2210 children are in the age group of 0–6 years, with sex ratio of 937. The average literacy rate stands at 73.62%.

Railways
Chagallu railway station in the South Coast Railway zone is located near Chagallu around 7 km away.

References

Villages in East Godavari district